Donskoy is a rural locality (a settlement) in Lyapichevskoye Rural Settlement, Kalachyovsky District, Volgograd Oblast, Russia. The population was 612 as of 2010. There are 13 streets.

Geography 
Donskoy is located 65 km southwest of Kalach-na-Donu (the district's administrative centre) by road. Lyapichev is the nearest rural locality.

References 

Rural localities in Kalachyovsky District